Harbor–UCLA Medical Center, is a 570-bed public teaching hospital located at  1000 West Carson Street in West Carson, an unincorporated area within Los Angeles County, California. As implied by the name, the hospital is owned by the Los Angeles County and operated by the Los Angeles County Department of Health Services, while doctors are faculty of the David Geffen School of Medicine at UCLA, who oversee the medical residents being trained at the facility.

The facility is one of two level I trauma centers (providing the highest level of surgical care to trauma patients) operated by Los Angeles County, the other is LAC+USC Medical Center.

History
A medical facility was originally opened on the site in 1943 as the U.S. Army's Port of Embarkation Hospital, which was a receiving point for the wounded returned from the Pacific theater during World War II.

In February 1946, the county purchased the facility from the Federal Government in order to decentralize the activities of the Los Angeles County General Hospital, one of the largest institutions of its kind in the world, and founded a branch hospital to serve the South Bay and Long Beach areas.

The Los Angeles County Harbor General Hospital began its affiliation with UCLA School of Medicine in 1951. Construction of the present eight-story hospital building was completed in late 1962 on the easterly portion of the grounds, at Carson Street and Vermont Avenue, replacing a number of the wooden barracks and cottages comprising Harbor General. It was dedicated January 14, 1963.

Affiliation with the UCLA School of Dentistry was established in 1972. On September 1, 1978, the name of the hospital changed officially to Los Angeles County Harbor–UCLA Medical Center in order to draw attention to its working relationship with the UCLA School of Medicine.

On December 13, 1983, the Los Angeles County Board of Supervisors approved the Harbor-UCLA Medical Center as one of the first six trauma centers in Los Angeles County, all of which were designated Level I. The Supervisors stipulated that they be open for business at 8 a.m. two days later. Two more (UCLA Medical Center and Cedars-Sinai Medical Center) gained Level I status later that month and still have that standing today. Today, Harbor-UCLA is the only Level I trauma center south of the Santa Monica Freeway and Santa Ana Freeway as well as west of the Los Angeles-Orange County line.

The Harbor–UCLA Medical Center campus is home to The Lundquist Institute for Biomedical Innovation, an independent, not-for-profit research institute. Originally known as the Harbor-UCLA Research and Education Institute (REI), then as The Los Angeles Biomedical Research Institute  (LA BioMed), The Lundquist Institute has been conducting biomedical research, training young scientists and providing community services, such as one of California's largest and most comprehensive Women, Infants and Children (WIC) Programs.

In Popular Culture

The main eight-story hospital building became known the world over as the fictional "Rampart General Hospital" in the popular 1972 to 1977 television series, Emergency!. The emergency receiving area as seen in the television series was completely remodeled in the 2000s, and no longer appears as it did in the show.

Innovations
Pioneering research in many fields such as reproductive endocrinology, genetics, infectious diseases, trauma and respiratory medicine has brought worldwide attention to the Harbor-UCLA campus. Among the major milestones are:
 In 1984, Harbor-UCLA was the first institution in the world to achieve successful pregnancies using the technique of ovum transfer. The research team was directed by Dr. John Buster that performed history's first embryo transfer from one woman to another resulting in a live birth and led to the announcement on February 3, 1984. In the procedure, an embryo that was just beginning to develop was transferred from one woman in whom it had been conceived by artificial insemination to another woman who gave birth to the infant 38 weeks later. The sperm used in the artificial insemination came from the husband of the woman who bore the baby.

This scientific breakthrough established standards and became an agent of change for women suffering from the afflictions of infertility and for women who did not want to pass on genetic disorders to their children. Donor embryo transfer has given women a mechanism to become pregnant and give birth to a child that will contain their husband's genetic makeup. Although donor embryo transfer as practiced today has evolved from the original non-surgical method, it now accounts for approximately 5% of in vitro fertilization recorded births.

This work established the technical foundation and legal-ethical framework surrounding the clinical use of human oocyte and embryo donation, a mainstream clinical practice, which has evolved over the past 25 years.

Building upon Dr. Buster's groundbreaking research and since the initial birth announcement in 1984, well over 47,000 live births resulting from donor embryo transfer have been and continue to be recorded by the Centers for Disease Control (CDC) in the United States to infertile women, who otherwise would not have had children by any other existing method.
 The discovery by A.F. Parlow, PhD, of the molecular structure of the human follicle stimulating hormone (FSH) and luteinizing hormone. The Parlow Pituitary Hormone and Antisera Laboratory produces highly purified pituitary components which are used in research and therapy around the world. One of the hormones produced, human growth hormone, is used to prevent severe growth retardation in thousands of children around the world.
 Dr. Delbert Fisher was the first to comprehensively characterize the ontogenesis of fetal thyroid development. He went on to conceptualize and then develop a simple, highly effective newborn screening test for congenital hypothyroidism, including developing the micro assay methods that made it possible to screen on a national scale.
 Internationally renowned genetics research to help treat and prevent short stature, led by Dr. David Rimoin. He was responsible for early work on disorders of growth hormone metabolism, for expanding the knowledge of dwarfism and developing the $2.2 million Skeletal Dysplasia Center at Harbor-UCLA.
 Dr. J. Michael Criley's cardiac research into improved cardiac resuscitation techniques and better training of emergency paramedics, leading to the country's first hospital-based paramedic training program.
 A major discovery in defining the basic biochemical defect in a skin disease, known as x-linked ichthyosis. Dr. Larry Shapiro's discovery that this was a hereditary disease was a significant breakthrough and led to improved treatment strategies.
 Dr. Michael Kaback's advances in developing and improving screening for Tay–Sachs disease, an inherited, fatal disorder. Harbor-UCLA has become the headquarters for the California and international screening programs for the disease.
 Definitive studies of lung surfactant have resulted in saving the lives of thousands of premature infants who would have died because of immature lungs.
 The establishment of the UCLA Center for Vaccine Research. Work at the center has contributed to the licensure of several new vaccines and to the establishment of new national recommendations for childhood immunizations. These new vaccines have protected millions of newborns, children and adults from diseases such as meningitis, whooping cough and pneumonia.
 The development of scintimammography to detect breast cancer without invasive biopsies, is one of the many imaging procedures developed at Harbor-UCLA.
 A detachable balloon catheter, an artificial elbow, and an implant for use in maxillofacial surgery, are among the many devices developed here.
 The receipt of a $1 million grant from the Robert Wood Johnson Foundation and the Pew Charitable Trusts to redesign how patient care is delivered. Harbor-UCLA was one of 20 hospitals nationwide—and the only one on the West Coast—to be awarded the grant. As a result, culture shifts occurred which emphasize leadership, community and the development of interdisciplinary collaboration. The grant also provided seed money and resources to assist with individual and group development.

Attached Paramedic Units
Harbor–UCLA Medical Center provides medical control for the following Paramedic units.
 Compton Fire Department – Rescue Ambulance (RA) 41
Los Angeles Fire Department – RAs 33, 36, 38, 48, 51, 57, 64, 79, 85, 101, and 112
Los Angeles County Fire Department – Rescue Squads 14, 21, 36, 106, 116, 158, 161 and 171.
 Manhattan Beach Fire Department – RA 21
 Redondo Beach Fire Department – RAs 61 & 62
 Torrance Fire Department- Rescues 91, 93, and 95

Heliport
In 2013 the new rooftop heliport was completed, equipped with rooftop lights surrounding the helipad and a windsock to indicate the wind direction.  Rescue copters of L.A.F.D, L.A County Fire Dept. & the U.S. Coast Guard use the new heliport.

Notable people
J. Michael Criley, professor at the David Geffen School of Medicine.
Terry Dubrow, plastic surgeon and television personality.
Charles Grob, professor and Director of the Division of Child and Adolescent Psychiatry at Harbor–UCLA Medical Center.
Emil Kakkis, medical geneticist.
Joel D. Kopple, professor, physician, and clinical investigator in medicine, nephrology, nutrition, and public health.
David L. Reich, academic anesthesiologist and professor; President & Chief Operating Officer of the Mount Sinai Hospital, and President of Mount Sinai Queens.

See also

Hospitals in California
Olive View-UCLA Medical Center
UCLA Medical Center, Santa Monica
Ronald Reagan UCLA Medical Center
Science 37

References

External links
Harbor-ucla.org: official Harbor-UCLA Medical Center website
OSHPD Project: Harbor–UCLA Medical Center in the CA Healthcare Atlas

County hospitals in California
Hospitals in Los Angeles County, California
Buildings and structures in Torrance, California
Teaching hospitals in California
University of California, Los Angeles buildings and structures
Education in Torrance, California
Organizations based in Torrance, California
Hospitals established in 1946
1946 establishments in California
Hospital buildings completed in 1962
UCLA Health
Public hospitals in the United States